1982 is the debut album by American hip-hop duo 1982, composed of record producer Statik Selektah and rapper Termanology. The album was released on October 26, 2010

Track listing 
All tracks are produced by Statik Selektah

Chart history

References

External links 
 1982 at undergroundhiphop.com

Termanology albums
2010 albums
Statik Selektah albums
Albums produced by Statik Selektah